William Russell Smith (March 27, 1815 – February 26, 1896) was a prominent Alabama politician who served in both the United States Congress and the Confederate Congress.

Biography
Smith was born in Logan County, Kentucky. He moved to Alabama at an early age and attended the University of Alabama. Smith was admitted to the bar in 1835.

The next year he served as a captain of state troops in the government's campaign against the Creek Indians, intended to remove most of them to Indian Territory west of the Mississippi River. He served as Mayor of Tuscaloosa in 1839 and as a member of the Alabama House of Representatives from 1841 to 1843. He later briefly served as a state judge from 1850 to 1851.

Smith was elected to four terms in the United States House of Representatives, serving from 1851 to 1857, representing the Fourth District.

At the outbreak of the American Civil War, Smith raised the 26th Alabama Infantry Regiment and was elected its colonel. He stepped down to represent Alabama in the First and the Second Confederate Congresses, from 1862 to 1865.

After the war, he resumed his law practice in Tuscaloosa. He served as president of the University of Alabama from 1869 to 1871.

He died in Washington, D.C., on February 26, 1896. He was interred at Mount Olivet Cemetery in Washington, D.C.

References

 Retrieved on 2009-04-26
 Political Graveyard bio

External links

1815 births
1896 deaths
People from Logan County, Kentucky
Confederate States Army officers
Mayors of places in Alabama
Democratic Party members of the Alabama House of Representatives
Members of the Confederate House of Representatives from Alabama
Alabama Unionists
Alabama Secession Delegates of 1861
Politicians from Tuscaloosa, Alabama
Presidents of the University of Alabama
Unionist Party members of the United States House of Representatives
Democratic Party members of the United States House of Representatives from Alabama
Know-Nothing members of the United States House of Representatives from Alabama
Burials at Mount Olivet Cemetery (Washington, D.C.)
19th-century American politicians